Sportsman's Park was a series of baseball stadiums in St. Louis, Missouri, U.S.

Sportsman's Park may also refer to:

Sportsman's Park, area surrounding State Farm Stadium in Glendale, Arizona, U.S.
Sportsman's Park, horse racing track in Cicero, Illinois, U.S., which became Chicago Motor Speedway
Sportsman's Park, sports stadium in New Orleans, Louisiana, U.S., which became Crescent City Base Ball Park

See also
Sportsmans Park, Oregon, U.S., unincorporated community in Wasco County
Sportsman Park, ballpark located in Greenville, Mississippi, U.S.